A primary tumor is a tumor growing at the anatomical site where tumor progression began and proceeded to yield a cancerous mass. Most cancers develop at their primary site but then go on to metastasize or spread to other parts of the body. These further tumors are secondary tumors.

Most cancers continue to be called after their primary site, as in breast cancer or lung cancer for example, even after they have spread to other parts of the body. Cancer of unknown primary origin is cancer in which secondary tumors are found but the original primary site cannot be decided.

References
 

Types of neoplasia